The 2011 Solihull Metropolitan Borough Council election took place on 5 May 2011 to elect members of Solihull Metropolitan Borough Council in the West Midlands, England. Since the last election, the Liberal Democrats had defended a seat in a by-election in Olton, but had lost all three councillors for Shirley West, with Brynn Tudor being disqualified for non-attendance and the other two defecting: firstly with Howard Allen going Independent and then Simon Slater joining the Labour grouping. One third of the council was up for election and the Conservative Party gained overall control of the council from no overall control. Voter turnout naturally fell from the previous year's high turnout (caused by the 2010 general election being held alongside them), although to an above-average figure of 41.5%

Election result

This result had the following consequences for the total number of seats on the council after the elections :

Ward results

References

2011 English local elections
2011
2010s in the West Midlands (county)